The Taiwan Studio City is a theme park in Wufeng District, Taichung City, Taiwan.

See also
 List of tourist attractions in Taiwan

References

1990 establishments in Taiwan
1999 disestablishments in Taiwan
Defunct amusement parks
Amusement parks opened in 1990
Amusement parks closed in 1999
Former buildings and structures in Taiwan